John F. Keenan, (born 1964) is a member of the Massachusetts State Senate for the Norfolk and Plymouth district.

Prior to being elected to the Massachusetts State Senate he served on the Quincy City Council from 2003 to 2012. He finished his term on the Quincy City Council in January 2012 and did not seek re-election. He was sworn in to the State Senate on January 5, 2011. Senator Keenan ran unopposed in the general election in November 2012.

Early life, education, and early career 

John was born the fourth of seven children of Philip and Loretta Keenan. His father worked in the mailing room of the Record American, and then the Boston Herald, while his mother worked at Filene’s department store and then CNA Insurance. John was raised in Quincy and attended the Quincy Public Schools, graduating in 1982 from North Quincy High School. He went to Harvard University, earning his way through by working in the athletic department equipment room. He also worked the Saturday overnight shift at the Herald. John graduated with honors from Harvard in 1986, with a government concentration. Three years later, he graduated from Suffolk University Law School. A lifelong learner, John attended the Harvard Kennedy School as a Rappaport/Boston Urban Scholar, graduating in 2019 with a Master's Degree in Public Administration.

After law school, John worked first as a litigator, then as a public defender, followed by work as an attorney combating insurance fraud. He is admitted to practice in all Massachusetts State Courts, the Federal District Court for the District of Massachusetts, the Federal First Circuit Court of Appeals, and the United States Supreme Court.

While in law school, John was appointed to serve as the Chairperson of the Quincy Mayor’s Commission on Handicapped Affairs, and was then appointed to the Quincy Zoning Board of Appeals, on which he served for seven years. In 1997 he was appointed Executive Secretary in the administration of Quincy Mayor Jim Sheets. As Executive Secretary he managed 22 municipal department heads and was responsible for the preparation and presentation of Quincy’s budget and the review of all financial matters. In 2001, John became Executive Director of the Norfolk County Retirement System, a public pension system with approximately 10,000 active and retired members, and assets of over $500 million.

Quincy City Council
In 2003, John was appointed to the Quincy City Council to fill a vacant seat, and was elected Councilor at Large in 2004.  He was re-elected Councilor at Large four times, the last time topping the ticket.  He served as Chairman of the Council’s Finance Committee for eight years.

Massachusetts State Senate

2010 elections

In 2010, John F. Keenan ran for the Massachusetts State Senate, for the Norfolk and Plymouth district. He beat a Democratic Party primary challenger, Arthur Steven Tobin, with 9,539 to Tobin's 8,146, well over 55% of the vote. In the general election, Keenan defeated Republican Daniel M. Dewey and Independent Laura Innis, 29,982 votes to 18,582 for Dewey and 5,152 for Innis.

2012 elections
In 2012, Keenan, running for reelection, was unopposed in the Democratic primary, receiving all 5,309 votes cast. In the general election, he was unopposed, but garnered about 75% of the vote, with over 16,000 blank votes being submitted. His second term began in January, 2013.

2014 election
In 2014, Keenan faced republican challenger Les Gosule. A resident of Quincy, Massachusetts who is the father of a murder victim and one of the 'Three Strikes Activists', who worked over a decade to pass "Melissa’s Law" since his daughter Melissa Gosule was murdered in 1999. On November 4, 2014, Senator Keenan won reelection to a third term which started in January 2015.

2016, 2018, and 2020 Elections

John was re-elected to the State Senate in 2016, 2018, and 2020, each time challenged by Alexander Mendez.

Tenure
Since being elected to the Senate, John has served as the Senate Chair of the Joint Committee on Mental Health and Substance Abuse, the Senate Chair of the Joint Committee on Public Health, the Chair of the Senate Committee on Bonding, Capital Expenditures and State Assets, and as Chair of the Senate Committee on Post Audit and Oversight. In the 2021-2022 session, John serves as the Senate Chair of the Joint Committee on Housing and as Vice-Chair of the Joint Committee on Transportation.

Throughout his legislative career, John's policy focus has been on substance use, mental health, and other public health issues, as well as transportation and housing.

In the areas of drug policy, behavioral health, and public health, John has collaborated closely with public and behavioral health advocates producing impactful legislation and policies, with many becoming national models. For instance, he drafted and introduced legislation known as Chapter 55, a data collection model that has helped inform drug policy in Massachusetts. The Institute for Excellence in Government calls it, “a model of data-driven and interdisciplinary resolve with results that have begun to turn the tide.” The Massachusetts Medical Association has recognized it as, “the first of its kind in the country . . . generating breakthrough findings on the manifestations of opioid use disorder.” 
Also, in 2019 John was the Senate sponsor of  Chapter 133 of the Acts of 2019, An Act Modernizing Tobacco Control, first in the nation legislation banning all flavored e-cigarette/vaping products and all flavored tobacco products in Massachusetts. The Wall Street Journal called it the “U.S.’s toughest flavored-tobacco ban.” 

Committees
 Senate Chair, Joint Committee on Housing
 Vice Chair, Joint Committee on Transportation
 Past Chair, Senate Committee on Post Audit and Oversight
 Past Chair, Senate Committee on Bonding, Capital Expenditures and State Assets
 Past Chair, Joint Committee on Mental Health, Substance Use, and Recovery
 Past Vice Chair, Judiciary Committee
 Past Vice Chair, Housing Committee
 Senate Committee on Ways and Means
 Senate Committee on Reimagining Massachusetts Post Pandemic Resiliency
 Joint Committee on Financial Services
 Joint Committee on Health Care Financing
 Joint Committee on Children, Families and Persons with Disabilities
 Joint Committee on Senate Ways and Means
 Joint Committee on State Administration and Regulatory Oversight
 Joint Committee on Economic Development and Emerging Tech

Awards and recognition
 Tobacco Free Mass Legislative Champion Award, November 2020, for his “Outstanding efforts to end the harms of tobacco use in Massachusetts.” American Cancer Society Cancer Action Network, National Distinguished Advocacy Award, September 2020, in recognition of contributions to the fight against cancer for championing first-in-the-nation legislation prohibiting the sale of all flavored tobacco products, including menthol flavors, e-cigarettes, chewing tobacco and cigars in Massachusetts.
 Commonwealth of Massachusetts, Executive Office of Health and Human Services, Department of Mental Health, Certificate of Appreciation, February 2020, “In grateful acknowledgement of your legislative leadership for adults and children with mental illnesses and their families.”
 Quincy Democratic City Committee Dennis F. Ryan Community Award, October 2019 – recognizing an individual who is “passionate in their support and beliefs of the Democratic Party and who exemplifies those principles through their words and deeds.”
 DOVE – Domestic Violence Ended, Pillar of Hope Award, October 2018, “For your investment in DOVE and working with us to see domestic violence ended”
 Massachusetts Association of 766 Approved Private Schools, Legislator of the Year Award, October 2018
 Norfolk County Central Labor Council, Legislator of the Year Award, May 2018
 Massachusetts Ambulance Association, Legislator of the Year Award, February 2018
 Independence Academy, a sober high school, Champion Award, March 2017
 Mass Access, State Legislator of the Year, 2017, “For preserving the mission of Community Media Television in Massachusetts”
 Bar Association of Norfolk County, Person of the Year, May 2016
 Massachusetts League of Community Health Centers, Community Health Center Leader Award, April 2016
 Quincy Community Action Programs, Inc., Extra Mile Community Award, May 2016 - recognizing commitment to helping low-income residents and as a “champion for Head Start Services”
 Manet Community Health, The Manet Medallion, May 2015 - “For outstanding dedication, leadership and service to the community”
 Good Shepherd’s Maria Droste Counseling Services Maria Droste Award, November 2015 - “In gratitude for your commitment to community service”
 Massachusetts Developmental Disabilities Council and the ARC of Massachusetts, March 2015 – “Legislator of the Year for strong commitment to those with intellectual and developmental disabilities”
 Association for Behavioral Healthcare, October 2014, “In honor of your leadership in support of addiction treatment services”
 Massachusetts Coalition for Suicide Prevention, MCSP Leadership in Suicide Prevention Award, March 2014
 Massachusetts Nurses Association, Legislative Advocacy Award, 2013
 Impact Quincy, Community Hero Award, December 2012 – “In recognition of outstanding leadership and dedication to the prevention of substance abuse”
 Labor Assistance Professionals of Massachusetts, November 2012 – “In appreciation for your dedication and service to recovery in our community”

Personal life
John is married with three children.  He is a member of the Merrymount Association, the Ward One Democratic Committee, the Quincy City Club, Friends of the Thomas Crane Public Library, and the Harvard Club of Quincy.  He served for seven years as a member of the Quincy Zoning Board of Appeals, and also coached in the Sacred Heart Youth Basketball Program for several years.

Keenan is also a practicing Catholic.

See also
 2019–2020 Massachusetts legislature
 2021–2022 Massachusetts legislature

References

External links
State Senator John F. Keenan website
Senator John F. Keenan biography on Mass.gov

1964 births
Living people
Politicians from Quincy, Massachusetts
Democratic Party Massachusetts state senators
Harvard University alumni
21st-century American politicians
Suffolk University Law School alumni
Public defenders